Whitehall Glacier is a large glacier flowing north into Tucker Inlet between Daniell Peninsula and the southeast part of the Victory Mountains, in Victoria Land. Named by New Zealand Geological Survey Antarctic Expedition (NZGSAE), 1957–58, partly because of the literal meaning and partly with reference to the proximity of the glacier to the Admiralty Mountains, the Admiralty office in London being situated in Whitehall.

Glaciers of Victoria Land
Borchgrevink Coast